These are things named after Felix Klein (1849 – 1925), a German mathematician.

Mathematics
Klein bottle
Solid Klein bottle
Klein configuration
Klein cubic threefold
Klein four-group
Klein geometry
Klein graphs
Klein's inequality
Klein model
Klein polyhedron
Klein surface
Klein quadric
Klein quartic
Kleinian group
Kleinian integer
Kleinian model
Kleinian ring
Kleinian singularity
Klein's icosahedral cubic surface
Klein's j-invariant
Beltrami–Klein model
Cayley–Klein metric
Clifford–Klein form
Schottky–Klein prime form

Other
Klein's Encyclopedia of Mathematical Sciences
The Felix Klein Protocols
Felix Klein medal, named after the first president of the ICMI (1908–1920), honours a lifetime achievement in mathematics education research.
 The Klein project of the IMU and ICMI aims to produce a book for upper secondary teachers that communicates the breadth and vitality of the research discipline of mathematics and connects it to the senior secondary school curriculum.

Klein